The CWA British Commonwealth Championship was a secondary singles championship in the German promotion Catch Wrestling Association (CWA). The title was first established as a British-exclusive title and awarded to Englishman Tony St. Clair. The title was deactivated in 1999 when CWA closed. The championship was contested under 10 three-minute rounds.

Title history

Key

Reigns

See also
Professional wrestling in the United Kingdom

References

Catch Wrestling Association championships
National professional wrestling championships
Professional wrestling in the United Kingdom